Moonlight and Pretzels is a 1933 American Pre-Code musical film, directed by Karl Freund, about a man who puts on a Broadway show. The film was released by Universal Studios and featured Mary Brian and William Frawley, now best-known as "Fred Mertz" on the 1950s TV show I Love Lucy; Freund was the groundbreaking cinematographer for I Love Lucy.

Cast
Leo Carrillo as Nick Pappacropolis (credited as Leo Carillo)
Mary Brian as Sally Upton
Roger Pryor as George Dwight
Herbert Rawlinson as Sport Powell
Lillian Miles as Elsie Warren
Bobby Watson as Bertie
William Frawley as Mac
Jack Denny as himself (credited as Jack Denny and His Orchestra)
Frank Britton as himself (credited as Frank and Milt Britton and Band)
Milt Britton as  himself (credited as Frank and Milt Britton and Band)
Alexander Gray as singer
Bernice Claire as singer
Eton Boys as themselves (Musical Vocal Ensemble)
John Hundley as Man in Bed
Doris Carson as Woman in Bed

Production
The film was not produced in Hollywood, but was filmed at the Astoria Studios in Astoria, Queens, New York City, primarily used by Paramount Pictures. The dances were choreographed by Bobby Connolly.

Critical reception
A contemporary review in Variety reported that the film "moves along at a sprightly pace and has sufficient pep to hold interest," noting the film's "several nice tunes," "some good dance routines," and "a good looking line of girls." The review also notes "[o]n the negative side of the ledger are a pretty dull and routine story, practically no laughs and no actual cast stars." A modern review of the film by Danny Reid notes that although it "was obviously made on a tight budget [...] and its numbers never escape feeling stage bound," it contains "a few undeniable charms that make it an enjoyable experience."

References

External links
 

1933 films
1933 musical films
Films directed by Karl Freund
American black-and-white films
American musical films
Films shot at Astoria Studios
1930s English-language films
1930s American films